Ryan Ellis (born 1991) is a Canadian ice hockey defenceman.

Ryan Ellis may also refer to:

Ryan Ellis (racing driver) (born 1989), American professional stock car racing driver
Ryan Ellis (baseball) (born 1978), American baseball coach

See also
Ellis Ryan (1904–1966), principal owner of the Cleveland Indians, 1949–1952